The modern Western Assam is culturally distinct region. This list specifically focuses on people from Western Assam.

References

People from Western Assam
Western Assam